The Nishisonogi coalfield is a coalfield which lies on the coast of Nagasaki.

See also
Mitsubishi Takashima coal mine
Mitsubishi Hashima coal mine

Coal mining regions in Asia